Aljaž Bedene was the defending champion but chose not to defend his title.

Mikhail Kukushkin won the title after defeating Matteo Berrettini 6–2, 3–6, 6–1 in the final.

Seeds

Draw

Finals

Top half

Bottom half

References
Main Draw
Qualifying Draw

Irving Tennis Classic - Singles
2018 Singles